UTC−01:00 is an identifier for a time offset from UTC of −01:00.

As standard time (Northern Hemisphere winter)

Arctic Ocean
Denmark
Greenland
Ittoqqortoormiit, Neerlerit Inaat and surrounding areas

Atlantic Ocean
Portugal
Azores islands

As standard time (year-round)

Africa

Atlantic Ocean
Cape Verde

Anomalies

Regions in UTC-02:00 longitudes using UTC-01:00 time 

 The westernmost part of legal UTC-01:00 area in Ittoqqortoormiit Municipality (East Greenland)
 Azores islands (Portugal)
 Cape Verde

Areas in UTC-01:00 longitudes using other time zones

Using UTC-03:00 

 The easternmost tip of Greenland (excluding legal UTC-1 and UTC±0 areas)

Using UTC±00:00 
In Africa:

 Liberia
 Sierra Leone
 Guinea
 Guinea-Bissau
 Senegal
 The Gambia
 Sahrawi Arab Democratic Republic (disputed territory)
 Most of Mauritania
 Southwesternmost part of Mali
 The very westernmost part of Ivory Coast

In Atlantic Ocean:
Madeira (Portugal)

In Europe:
 Most of Iceland, except the westernmost part, including northwest peninsula and main town of Ísafjörður (lies in "physical" time UTC-2)
 Most of Portugal, west of 7.5ºW, except the easternmost part, including cities such as Bragança and Guarda (lies in "physical" UTC)
 Northeastern part of Greenland, including Danmarkshavn
 The western part of Ireland, west of 7.5ºW, including the cities of Cork, Limerick, and Galway
 Westernmost tip of Northern Ireland, including the county town of County Fermanagh, Enniskillen
 Westernmost island of the Faroe Islands (autonomous region of the Danish Kingdom), Mykines
 Extreme westerly portion of the Outer Hebrides, in the west of Scotland; for instance, Vatersay, an inhabited island and the westernmost settlement of Great Britain, lies at 7°54'W. If uninhabited islands or rocks are taken into account St Kilda, west of the Outer Hebrides, at 8°58'W, and Rockall, at 13°41'W, should be included.
 Canary Islands (Spain)

Using UTC+01:00 
In Africa:
 Southwestern part of Morocco, including Casablanca
 Most part in Western Sahara (occupied by Morocco, excluding claimed by Sahrawi Arab Democratic Republic which use UTC+00:00)
In Europe:

 Parts of Galicia, Extremadura and Andalucia, Spain
 Jan Mayen, Norway

External links

UTC offsets